Serena Williams defeated the two-time defending champion, her sister Venus Williams, in a rematch of the previous year's final, 6–4, 6–3 to win the women's singles tennis title at the 2002 US Open. It was her second US Open singles title, her fourth major singles title overall, the third component of her first "Serena Slam" (a non-calendar year Grand Slam and career Grand Slam), and her second consecutive major title won without losing a set.

This marked the final major appearance for four-time major champion and former world No. 1 Arantxa Sánchez Vicario, who lost to Marion Bartoli in the first round. It was also the first major appearance for future world No. 1 and three-time major finalist Dinara Safina, who lost in the second round to Serena Williams.

This US Open marked the final appearance of two-time champion Monica Seles who lost to Venus Williams in the quarterfinals.

Seeds

Qualifying

Draw

Finals

Top half

Section 1

Section 2

Section 3

Section 4

Bottom half

Section 5

Section 6

Section 7

Section 8

Other entry information

Wild cards

Protected ranking

Qualifiers

Withdrawals

References

External links
2002 US Open – Women's draws and results at the International Tennis Federation

2002 US Open (tennis)
US Open (tennis) by year – Women's singles
2002 in women's tennis
2002 in American women's sports